Paul Davies (born 22 June 1970) is a Welsh former professional snooker player who lives in Cardiff. He turned professional in 1991.

Initially based in Hampshire, Davies began his career in which he was mentored by a local amateur snooker player by the name of Bert Garland who died in 1996. Paul now owns his snooker cue.

Career
He made an immediate impact, reaching two semi-finals in his first 3 seasons – the 1991 Dubai Classic and the 1993 Asian Open, losing to the eventual champions (John Parrott and Dave Harold) in each case. However he has never gone this far in a ranking event again. He has never qualified for the World Championship, losing in the final qualifying round four times.

In 1997 he was runner up to Andy Hicks in the Benson and Hedges Qualifying, losing 6–9 in the final, denying him a place at the wildcard stage at Wembley. He reached the quarter-Finals of the 1997 Welsh Open with wins over Dave Harold, Chris Small and Ken Doherty before Mark Williams ended his run by beating him 5–3.

He came close to defeating Ding Junhui in the 2006 Northern Ireland Trophy, losing 4–5 in the last 48 to the eventual champion. He qualified for the 2007 Grand Prix, producing two shocks in his group, beating Jamie Cope the previous year's runner up and Stephen Hendry, effectively knocking the latter out the tournament. However he lost his other 3 matches eventually finishing 5th in his group.

He had a good run in the 2007 UK Championship, enjoying wins over Kurt Maflin 9–6, Mark Davis 9–8, before defeating Dominic Dale 9–3 to reach the last 32 and earn a place in the televised stages, where he did well to hold Shaun Murphy to 4–4, before Murphy eventually won 9–5.

Performance and rankings timeline

Career finals

Non-ranking finals: 2

Pro–am finals: 2 (1 title)

References

External links
 
 Profile on Global Snooker
 Profile on Pro Snooker Blog

1970 births
Living people
Welsh snooker players
Snooker players from Cardiff
Competitors at the 2009 World Games